The Wentworth Hotel is located on the corner of Murray Street and William Street in Perth, Western Australia.

The hotel was known as the Gordons Hotel prior to the First World War.

It was rebuilt by Mary Thomas (later Mary Raine) in 1927–1928 as the Wentworth, with Western Australian newspapers seeing the centenary of the state in 1929 as a motivation for new and renovated hotels for increased accommodation.

During the Second World War the hotel attracted publicity over troops fighting, causing the hotel to be made out of bounds to troops.  The hotel was also cautioned on drinks provision by the licensing court in the same year.

The hotel is part of the Raine Square block and has been included in heritage assessments of the block.

Notes

Historic hotels in Perth, Western Australia
William Street, Perth
Raine Square
State Register of Heritage Places in the City of Perth